The 1998–99 Algerian Cup was the 34th edition of the Algerian Cup. USM Alger won the Cup by defeating JS Kabylie 2-0. It was USM Alger fourth  Algerian Cup in its history.

Round of 64

Round of 32

Round of 16

Quarter-finals

Semi-finals

Final

Champions

External links
 1998/99 Coupe Nationale

References 

Algerian Cup
Algerian Cup
Algerian Cup